= Uranipuram =

- Village
- Location in Tamil Nadu, India Uranipuram (India)
- Coordinates: 10.48°N 79.20°E
- Country: India
- State: Tamil Nadu
- District: Thanjavur

Government
  - Type: Panchayat
  - Body: DMDK

Population (2011)
  - Total: 4,493

Languages
  - Official: Tamil
- Time zone: UTC+5:30 (IST)
- PIN: 614614
- Telephone code: 04372
- Vehicle registration: TN 49

Uranipuram is a small village located in the Thanjavur District of Tamil Nadu, India. Uranipuram is located at 10.48°N 79.20°E and the total geographical area is 618.61 hectares. It has an average elevation of 23 metres above sea level.

== Demographics ==
According to census of India 2011, the village has population of 4493. The total population constitutes 2190 males and 2303 females. The total household of Uranipuram village is 1082.
